Bohumil Jílek (17 October 1892, in Deštná – 3 August 1963, in New York City) was a Czechoslovak politician and General Secretary of the Communist Party of Czechoslovakia from 1925 to 1929.

Deposed by Klement Gottwald, he joined a new parliamentary club called Communist Party of Czechoslovakia (Leninists).

Before he worked as journalist. After 1948, he left for France, and later to the United States.

His father Jan Jílek was a local policeman; his mother Františka née Vosolová.

References

Sources 
http://www.libri.cz/databaze/kdo20/list.php?od=j&start=21&count=20
http://www.psp.cz/eknih/1925ns/ps/tisky/t0758_00.htm

1892 births
1963 deaths
People from Deštná (Jindřichův Hradec District)
People from the Kingdom of Bohemia
Communist Party of Czechoslovakia politicians
Republican Party of Farmers and Peasants politicians
Members of the Chamber of Deputies of Czechoslovakia (1925–1929)
Czech communists
Czech journalists
Czech exiles
Czechoslovak emigrants to the United States
20th-century journalists